Alice Aprot Nawowuna (born 2 January 1994) is a Kenyan long-distance runner who competes mainly in track running and cross country running competitions. She is the sister of former world champion Joseph Ebuya. She was the gold medallist in the 10,000 metres at the 2015 African Games, where she also won 5000 metres bronze. She was a bronze medallist at the 2014 African Cross Country Championships.

Career
Aprot emerged on the Kenyan cross country running circuit as a teenager. She made her international debut at the age of sixteen, coming ninth in the junior race of the 2010 IAAF World Cross Country Championships. Among a strong 5000 metres field at the 2010 World Junior Championships in Athletics, she took the bronze medal behind future world medallists Genzebe Dibaba and Mercy Cherono. The event marked a change for Aprot, who wore spikes rather than going barefoot as she previously had, but she managed a personal best of 15:17.39 minutes. She made her debut on the IAAF Diamond League series that year, coming fifth at the DN Galan.

Aprot was less successful in the 2011 season, managing only fifth in the junior race at the 2011 African Cross Country Championships. She missed the remainder of the season and only returned to regular competition in 2014, the same year she entered the senior ranks. Her first senior medal came at the 2014 African Cross Country Championships, where she was an individual bronze medallist and a team gold medallist. She placed fifth at the Kenyan World Championships trials event, but this earned her selection for both the 5000 m and 10,000 metres events at the 2015 African Games. She excelled at that event, setting an African Games record of 31:24.18, beating compatriot Gladys Chesire. She was also a 5000 m bronze medallist, completing a Kenyan podium sweep with Margaret Chelimo and Rosemary Wanjiru.

She began the 2016 season with wins at the Campaccio and Antrim International Cross Country meetings.

At the Rio 2016 Olympics Aprot came in fourth place in the 10,000m, Aprot was responsible for the extremely fast pace that helped Almaz Ayana break the world record, and Aprot set a personal best time of 29:53.51 which marks her as the fifth fastest 10,000m runner of all time behind the three athletes who beat her in the Olympic final and Wang Junxia of China.

At the 2017 IAAF World Cross Country Championships in Kampala, Uganda Aprot came second to her fellow Kenyan, Irene Chepet Cheptai. Aprot won the team gold as Kenya secured positions 1-6 in the senior women's race.

Also in 2017 she competed in the 10,000 m at the 2017 World Championships, placing 4th with a time of 31:11.86.

International competitions

Circuit wins
Tuskys Wareng Cross Country: 2014, 2015
Antrim International Cross Country: 2016
Campaccio: 2016

See also
List of African Games medalists in athletics (women)

References

External links
 
 

Living people
1994 births
Kenyan female long-distance runners
Kenyan female cross country runners
Olympic female long-distance runners
Olympic athletes of Kenya
Athletes (track and field) at the 2016 Summer Olympics
African Games gold medalists for Kenya
African Games gold medalists in athletics (track and field)
Athletes (track and field) at the 2015 African Games
World Athletics Championships athletes for Kenya
African Cross Country Championships winners